Rathcunikeen or  Rathcumrikeen is a townland in the civil parish of Ballymurreen, County Tipperary in Ireland. It is an exclave of the parish, as it is surrounded by the neighbouring civil parish of Two-Mile-Borris.

References

Townlands of County Tipperary